In mathematics, an ultralimit is a geometric construction that assigns to a sequence of metric spaces Xn a limiting metric space. The notion of an ultralimit captures the limiting behavior of finite configurations in the spaces Xn and uses an ultrafilter to avoid the process of repeatedly passing to subsequences to ensure convergence. An ultralimit is a generalization of the notion of Gromov–Hausdorff convergence of metric spaces.

Ultrafilters

Limit of a sequence of points with respect to an ultrafilter

If  is a sequence of points in a metric space (X,d) and x∈ X, the point x is called the ω -limit of xn, denoted , if for every  we have:

It is not hard to see the following:
 If an ω -limit of a sequence of points exists, it is unique.
 If  in the standard sense, . (For this property to hold it is crucial that the ultrafilter be non-principal.)

Ultralimit of metric spaces with specified base-points
Let (Xn,dn) be a sequence of metric spaces with specified base-points pn∈Xn.

Let us say that a sequence , where xn∈Xn, is admissible, if the sequence of real numbers (dn(xn,pn))n is bounded, that is, if there exists a positive real number C such that  .

It is easy to see from the triangle inequality that for any two admissible sequences  and  the sequence (dn(xn,yn))n is bounded and hence there exists an ω-limit  . Let us define a relation  on the set  of all admissible sequences as follows. For  we have  whenever  It is easy to show that  is an equivalence relation on 

The ultralimit with respect to ω of the sequence (Xn,dn, pn) is a metric space  defined as follows.

As a set, we have  .

For two -equivalence classes  of admissible sequences  and  we have 

It is not hard to see that  is well-defined and that it is a metric on the set  .

Denote  .

On basepoints in the case of uniformly bounded spaces

Suppose that (Xn,dn) is a sequence of metric spaces of uniformly bounded diameter, that is, there exists a real number C>0 such that diam(Xn)≤C for every .  Then for any choice pn of base-points in Xn every sequence  is admissible. Therefore, in this situation the choice of base-points does not have to be specified when defining an ultralimit, and the ultralimit  depends only on (Xn,dn)  and on ω but does not depend on the choice of a base-point sequence . In this case one writes .

Basic properties of ultralimits

If (Xn,dn) are geodesic metric spaces then  is also a geodesic metric space.
If (Xn,dn) are complete metric spaces then  is also a complete metric space.
Actually, by construction, the limit space is always complete, even when (Xn,dn)
is a repeating sequence of a space (X,d) which is not complete.
If (Xn,dn) are compact metric spaces that converge to a compact metric space (X,d) in the Gromov–Hausdorff sense (this automatically implies that the spaces (Xn,dn) have uniformly bounded diameter), then the ultralimit  is isometric to (X,d).
Suppose that (Xn,dn) are proper metric spaces and that  are base-points such that the pointed sequence  (Xn,dn,pn) converges to a proper metric space (X,d) in the Gromov–Hausdorff sense. Then the ultralimit  is isometric to (X,d).
Let κ≤0 and let (Xn,dn)  be a sequence of CAT(κ)-metric spaces. Then the ultralimit  is also a CAT(κ)-space.
Let (Xn,dn)  be a sequence of CAT(κn)-metric spaces where  Then the ultralimit  is real tree.

Asymptotic cones
An important class of ultralimits are the so-called asymptotic cones of metric spaces.

The notion of an asymptotic cone plays an important role in geometric group theory since asymptotic cones (or, more precisely, their topological types and bi-Lipschitz types) provide quasi-isometry invariants of metric spaces in general and of finitely generated groups in particular. Asymptotic cones also turn out to be a useful tool in the study of relatively hyperbolic groups and their generalizations.

Examples
Let (X,d) be a compact metric space and put (Xn,dn)=(X,d) for every . Then the ultralimit  is isometric to (X,d).
Let (X,dX) and (Y,dY) be two distinct compact metric spaces and let (Xn,dn) be a sequence of metric spaces such that for each n either (Xn,dn)=(X,dX) or (Xn,dn)=(Y,dY). Thus A1, A2 are disjoint and   Therefore, one of A1, A2  has ω-measure 1 and the other has ω-measure 0. This shows that the ultralimit can depend on the choice of an ultrafilter ω.
Let (M,g) be a compact connected Riemannian manifold of dimension m, where g is a Riemannian metric on M. Let d be the metric on M corresponding to g, so that (M,d) is a geodesic metric space. Choose a basepoint p∈M. Then the ultralimit (and even the ordinary Gromov-Hausdorff limit)  is isometric to the tangent space TpM of M at p with the distance function on TpM given by the inner product g(p). Therefore, the ultralimit  is isometric to the Euclidean space  with the standard Euclidean metric.
Let  be the standard m-dimensional Euclidean space with the standard Euclidean metric.
Let  be the 2-dimensional integer lattice where the distance between two lattice points is given by the length of the shortest edge-path between them in the grid.
Let  (X,d) be a δ-hyperbolic geodesic metric space for some δ≥0. Then the asymptotic cone  is a real tree.
Let (X,d) be a metric space of finite diameter. Then the asymptotic cone  is a single point.
Let (X,d) be a CAT(0)-metric space. Then the asymptotic cone  is also a CAT(0)-space.

Footnotes

References
John Roe. Lectures on Coarse Geometry. American Mathematical Society, 2003. ; Ch. 7.
L.Van den Dries, A.J.Wilkie, On Gromov's theorem concerning groups of polynomial growth and elementary logic. Journal of Algebra, Vol. 89(1984), pp. 349–374.
M. Kapovich B. Leeb. On asymptotic cones and quasi-isometry classes of fundamental groups of 3-manifolds, Geometric and Functional Analysis, Vol. 5 (1995), no. 3, pp. 582–603
M. Kapovich. Hyperbolic Manifolds and Discrete Groups. Birkhäuser, 2000. ; Ch. 9.
Cornelia Druţu and Mark Sapir (with an Appendix by Denis Osin and Mark Sapir), Tree-graded spaces and asymptotic cones of groups. Topology, Volume 44 (2005), no. 5, pp. 959–1058.
M. Gromov. Metric Structures for Riemannian and Non-Riemannian Spaces. Progress in Mathematics vol. 152, Birkhäuser, 1999. ; Ch. 3.
B. Kleiner and B. Leeb, Rigidity of quasi-isometries for symmetric spaces and Euclidean buildings.  Publications Mathématiques de L'IHÉS. Volume 86, Number 1, December 1997, pp. 115–197.

See also
Ultrafilter
Geometric group theory
Gromov-Hausdorff convergence

Geometric group theory
Metric geometry